Antti Kontiola is a Finnish former competitive figure skater. He is a three-time Nordic champion and six-time Finnish national champion. He placed 16th at the 1980 European Championships.

Competitive highlights

References 

Finnish male single skaters
Living people
Year of birth missing (living people)
Place of birth missing (living people)